Miodrag Kustudić (born 1 April 1951) is a former Yugoslav footballer who played as a striker.

Club career
After helping Srem win the Vojvodina League, Kustudić made his Yugoslav First League debut with Vojvodina in 1971. He spent three seasons at the club, before switching to Rijeka in 1974. After winning the Yugoslav Cup in 1978, Kustudić moved abroad to Spain and joined La Liga side Hércules. He also played for Mallorca, before returning to Rijeka in 1983.

International career
At international level, Kustudić was capped three times for Yugoslavia, making his debut in a November 1977 World Cup qualifier loss to Spain. His final appearance came in a May 1978 friendly against Italy.

Career statistics

Club

International

Honours
Srem
 Vojvodina League: 1970–71
Rijeka
 Yugoslav Cup: 1977–78

References

External links
 
 
 

1951 births
Living people
People from North Bačka District
Serbian people of Montenegrin descent
Yugoslav footballers
Serbian footballers
Montenegrin footballers
Association football forwards
Yugoslavia international footballers
FK Srem players
FK Vojvodina players
HNK Rijeka players
Hércules CF players
RCD Mallorca players
Yugoslav First League players
La Liga players
Segunda División players
Yugoslav expatriate footballers
Expatriate footballers in Spain
Yugoslav expatriate sportspeople in Spain